Gustave Laporte (born 17 February 1909, date of death unknown) was a Belgian wrestler. He competed in the men's freestyle bantamweight at the 1936 Summer Olympics.

References

External links
 

1909 births
Year of death missing
Belgian male sport wrestlers
Olympic wrestlers of Belgium
Wrestlers at the 1936 Summer Olympics
Place of birth missing